David Gilbertson (born October 29, 1949) is the former Chief Justice of the South Dakota Supreme Court.

Early life and education
Gilbertson attended South Dakota State University, graduating in 1972 with a Bachelor of Science in Geography. He then graduated from the University of South Dakota School of Law in 1975. He did not take the bar exam as he was admitted to the South Dakota bar under diploma privilege.

Career

Gilbertson established a private practice in Sisseton, South Dakota and simultaneously served as Roberts County Deputy State's Attorney and City Attorney for Sisseton.

State judicial service
In 1986 Governor Bill Janklow appointed him circuit judge of the Fifth Judicial Circuit. Janklow appointed Gilbertson an Associate Justice of the South Dakota Supreme Court April 3, 1995. He was retained by the voters for successive eight-year terms in 1998, 2006, and 2014.

When Chief Justice Robert A. Miller retired in 2001, Gilbertson was elected chief justice of the court. In 2009 Gilbertson was reelected to his third 4-year term as chief justice.

Gilberston retired upon reaching mandatory retirement age upon  the completion of his current term on January 5, 2021.

References

|-

1949 births
20th-century American judges
21st-century American judges
Chief Justices of the South Dakota Supreme Court
Living people
People from Sisseton, South Dakota
South Dakota lawyers
South Dakota state court judges
South Dakota State University alumni
Justices of the South Dakota Supreme Court
University of South Dakota School of Law alumni